Patrick "Patty" Ginnell (March 3, 1937 – November 17, 2003) was a Canadian professional ice hockey player and junior league coach.

Career

Playing career
Ginnell played a total of ten seasons professionally in the Western Hockey League and International Hockey League. While playing with the Flin Flon Bombers, he led them to a 64-9-2 record and won the 1957 Memorial Cup.

Coaching career
After his playing career ended, he coached for the next twenty years in the Western Hockey League for the Flin Flon Bombers, Victoria Cougars, Lethbridge Broncos, Medicine Hat Tigers and New Westminster Bruins. 

In 1974, he left the Flin Flon Bombers for the Victoria Cougars and had a first season record of 16-19-3. After seeing an increase in attendance once the team was winning, Ginnell signed a broadcasting contract and developed a plan to increase season ticket sales. However, his career with the Victoria Cougars came to an end after a brawl between his team and the Saskatoon Blades, although he remained their owner.

He was a scout for the St. Louis Blues after his coaching career came to an end.

Personal life
He died at age 66 after a long battle with cancer. His grandson Riley Ginnell has played with the Moose Jaw Warriors in the WHL.  His other grandchildren Brad Ginnell and Derek Ginnell also play hockey.

Awards and honours
WCHL Coach of the Year Award – 1969–70, 1970–71, 1972–73, 1974–75
Manitoba Hockey Hall of Fame honoured member

References

External links

1937 births
2003 deaths
Canadian ice hockey coaches
Canadian ice hockey right wingers
Des Moines Oak Leafs players
Edmonton Flyers (WHL) players
Flin Flon Bombers coaches
Flin Flon Bombers players
Ice hockey people from Manitoba
Lethbridge Broncos coaches
Medicine Hat Tigers coaches
New Westminster Bruins coaches
Omaha Knights (IHL) players
Sportspeople from Dauphin, Manitoba
Portland Buckaroos players
St. Louis Blues scouts
Seattle Totems (WHL) players
Troy Bruins players
Vancouver Canucks (WHL) players
Victoria Cougars (WHL) coaches